Numerous castles are found in the German state of Saarland. These buildings, some of which have a history of over 1000 years, were the setting of historical events, domains of famous personalities and are still imposing buildings to this day.

This list encompasses castles described in German as Burg (castle), Festung (fort/fortress), Schloss (manor house) and Palais/Palast (palace). Many German castles after the middle ages were mainly built as royal or ducal palaces rather than as a fortified building.

 Burg Bucherbach, Püttlingen
 Schloss Dagstuhl, Dagstuhl
 Dagstuhl Castle, Dagstuhl
 Burg Esch, Oberesch
 Festung Hohenburg, Homburg
 Gustavsburg (Jägersburg), Jägersburg
 Schloss Karlsberg, Homburg
 Jagdschloss Karlsbrunn, Karlsbrunn
 Burg Kerpen, Illingen
 Burg Kirkel, Kirkel
 Schloss LaMotte, Lebach
 Liebenburg, Namborn
 Burg Mengen (Bliesmengen-Bolchen)
 Merburg, Kirrberg
 Burg Montclair, Mettlach
 Burg Püttlingen
 Schloss Saarbrücken, Saarbrücken
 Altes Schloss (Scheiden)
 Siersburg, Rehlingen-Siersburg
 Stiefler Schloss, St. Ingbert
 Teufelsburg, Überherrn
 Burg Veldenz, Nohfelden
 Werexcastel, Niederwürzbach

See also
List of castles
List of castles in Germany

 
Saarland-related lists
Saarland